Ramachandrapuram may refer to places in India:

Ramachandrapuram, Konaseema, in the state of Andhra Pradesh
Ramachandrapuram mandal, Konaseema district
Ramachandrapuram revenue division, Dr. B.R. Ambedkar Konaseema district, Andhra Pradesh
Ramachandrapuram, Chittoor, in the state of Andhra Pradesh
Ramachandrapuram, Medak, in the state of Telangana
Ramachandrapuram (Assembly constituency), an assembly constituency in the Konaseema district of the state of Andhra Pradesh